Brian Galach (born 16 May 2001) is a Polish professional footballer who plays as a striker for Podlasie Biała Podlaska, on loan from Wisła Płock II.

Early and personal life
Galach was born in Poland, and attended Chingford Foundation School.

Club career

Crawley Town
After spending time with Leyton Orient (who he joined at under-9 level) and Aldershot Town, Galach signed for Crawley Town in June 2018. On 4 September 2018, Galach made his Crawley debut during their EFL Trophy group-stage tie against Tottenham Hotspur U23s. On 17 November 2018, Galach joined Isthmian League side Burgess Hill Town on a short-term loan, where he made 6 appearances and scored one goal. He made his league debut for Crawley in the final match of the 2018–19 season as a stoppage time substitute in a 3-1 League Two victory over Tranmere Rovers on 4 May 2019. On 3 January 2020, Galach joined Billericay Town on a one-month loan. On 4 February 2020, his loan was extended to the end of February. He played 6 times for them without scoring. He scored his first goals for Crawley on 10 November 2020 when he scored twice in an EFL Trophy group game against Ipswich Town. He left Crawley on 11 February 2021 after his contract was mutually terminated, having scored twice in eight matches in all competitions during his spell at the club.

Wisla Płock
On 16 February 2021, he signed for the reserve team of Wisła Płock on a contract until the end of the season. In July 2021, he moved on loan to Stomil Olsztyn. On 21 July 2022, he joined III liga side Podlasie Biała Podlaska on a one-year loan.

International career
In October 2015, Galach was called up to a training camp by the Poland under-15 national team.

Career statistics

References

2001 births
Living people
Polish footballers
Leyton Orient F.C. players
Aldershot Town F.C. players
Crawley Town F.C. players
Burgess Hill Town F.C. players
Billericay Town F.C. players
Wisła Płock players
OKS Stomil Olsztyn players
English Football League players
IV liga players
I liga players
Association football forwards
Polish expatriate footballers
Polish expatriates in England
Expatriate footballers in England
Poland youth international footballers